Live at the Cavern Club is a 1999 concert film starring Paul McCartney. It was filmed on 14 December 1999, during his concert at The Cavern Club, in Liverpool, England, and it was directed by Geoff Wonfor. On stage with McCartney were David Gilmour, Mick Green, Ian Paice, Pete Wingfield, and Chris Hall. The DVD earned Gold status in Australia.

Track listing
 "Honey Hush" (Joe Turner)
 "Blue Jean Bop" (Gene Vincent, Morris Levy)
 "Brown Eyed Handsome Man" (Chuck Berry)
 "Fabulous" (Harry Land, Jon Sheldon)
 "What It Is" (McCartney)
 "Lonesome Town" (Baker Knight)
 "Twenty Flight Rock" (Ned Fairchild)
 "No Other Baby" (Dickie Bishop, Bob Watson)
 "Try Not to Cry" (McCartney)
 "Shake a Hand" (Joe Morris)
 "All Shook Up" (Otis Blackwell, Elvis Presley)
 "I Saw Her Standing There" (Lennon–McCartney)
 "Party" (Jessie Mae Robinson)

Personnel
 Paul McCartney – bass, lead vocals
 David Gilmour – guitar, vocals
 Mick Green – guitar, vocals
 Ian Paice – drums
 Pete Wingfield – keyboards
 Chris Hall – accordion

Home media
The film was released on DVD and VHS on 19 June 2001 by Image Entertainment.

Certifications

References

External links

Paul McCartney video albums
Concert films
1999 films
Films directed by Geoff Wonfor